

Ward Results
The full results for all counties are available here: Local Elections Handbook 1981

Leeds Ward Results

Leeds Ward Casual Vacancies

References

1981 English local elections
1981
1980s in West Yorkshire